A missing person is a person who has disappeared for usually unknown reasons

Missing Person(s) or Missing People may also refer to:

 Missing persons (Pakistan), referring to the enforced disappearances in Pakistan
 Missing Persons (band), an American rock band
 Missing Persons (TV series), an American TV series (1993–94)
 The First 48: Missing Persons, documentary episode of the TV show The First 48
 The Missing Person, a 2009 American film
 Missing Person (novel) (French: Rue des Boutiques Obscures), a 1978 French novel by Patrick Modiano
 Missing People, UK charity
 The Missing People, 1940 film

See also
 Mising people, a South Asian ethnic group
 International Commission on Missing Persons
 List of missing people organizations
 "Of Missing Persons", short story by Jack Finney
 Missing Persons Unit, Australian TV documentary
 Bureau of Missing Persons, American comedic film